Torrie Malik (born 3 April 2004 in Redhill) is an English professional squash player. As of November 2022, she was ranked number 83 in the world. Her brothers Perry and Curtis are also professional squash players. She won the 2022 Czech Open.

References

2004 births
Living people
English female squash players